This is a list of members elected to the eighth Parliament of Uganda (2006 to 2011) in the 2006 general election. It was preceded by the seventh Parliament and succeeded by the ninth Parliament. The eighth Parliament was the first multi-party Parliament since the fourth Parliament, following the 2005 referendum.

List of members

References 
 http://www.ec.or.ug/sites/Elec_results/Directly%20Elected%20MPs%202006.pdf
 http://www.ec.or.ug/sites/Elec_results/Women%20MPs%202006.pdf
 http://www.ec.or.ug/sites/Elec_results/MP%20Special%20Interest%20Groups%202006.pdf
 http://www.acode-u.org/Files/Publications/PRS_28.pdf

Parliament of Uganda
Lists of political office-holders in Uganda